Goodwood, officially Phuane, is a town in Dr Ruth Segomotsi Mompati District Municipality in the North West province of South Africa.

References

Populated places in the Kagisano-Molopo Local Municipality